Lavoie is a surname of French origin. The meaning of la voie is "the way". The Lavoie name dates to the year 900, during the first Viking invasions, relating to nobles living close to a road. The name has remained throughout France and Canada.

People with Lavoie as surname
 Alexandre Lavoie (born 1992), Canadian ice hockey player
 Cheryl Lavoie, politician in New Brunswick, Canada
 Claude Lavoie Richer (1929–2014), Canadian cross-country skier 
 Daniel Lavoie (born 1949), Canadian singer–songwriter
 Dominic Lavoie (born 1967), Canadian-born Austrian former professional ice hockey player
 Djane Lavoie-Herz (1889–1982), Canadian pianist and teacher
 Don Lavoie (1951–2001), American economist
 Donald Lavoie (born 1942), self-proclaimed former hit man for the Dubois Gang organized crime group
 Elyse Lemay-Lavoie (born 1994), Canadian water polo player
 Francis T. Lavoie (1874–1947), Canadian politician
 François Lavoie (born 1993), Canadian ten-pin bowler
 Frédérick Lavoie, Canadian writer and journalist
 Gilbert R. Lavoie, medical doctor and non-fiction writer
 Jean-Sébastien Lavoie, French singer on the television series Nouvelle Star in 2003
 Jacques Lavoie (1936–2000), politician and member of the House of Commons of Canada
 Jean-Noël Lavoie (1927–2013), notary and former political figure in Quebec, Canada
 Kari Lavoie (born 1977), Canadian curler.
 Kathleen Lavoie (1949–2022), American microbiologist and explorer 
 Louis Lavoie (1905–1947), Canadian boxer. 
 Roland Kent LaVoie (born 1943), musician with stage name Lobo
 Marc Lavoie (born 1954), Canadian professor of economics 
 Marie-Renée Lavoie (born 1974), Canadian writer
 Omer Lavoie, senior officer in the Canadian Army
 Patrick Lavoie (born 1987), Canadian football fullback
 Paul S. Lavoie, candidate in the 1987 Gatineau municipal election in Quebec, Canada
 René Lavoie (1921–2000), Canadian politician
 Simon Lavoie (born 1979), Canadian film director and screenwriter
 Thérèse Lavoie-Roux (1928–2009), Canadian politician

People with Lavoie as middle name
 Claude Lavoie Richer (1929–2014), Canadian cross-country skier

Court cases 
 Lavoie v. Canada, a 2002 court case of the Supreme Court of Canada

Alternative spellings
 LaVoie (US)
 La Voie
 Lavoye
 Lavoy
 DeLavoye (US)
 Leavoy (US)
 LeVoy (US)
 LaVoy

See also
 La Voix (disambiguation)
 La Voz (disambiguation)
 The Voice (disambiguation)

French-language surnames